Basketball Club "BC" Barsy Atyrau is a Kazakhstani professional  basketball club based in the city of Atyrau in western Kazakhstan.

Founded in 2003, Barsy has competed in the Kazakhstan Basketball Championship, where they were champions in 2011 and 2016, the Kazakhstan Basketball Cup (winning in 2009), and the Baltic Basketball League.

For the 2014–15 season, the team also competed in the Rietumu līga (Western league), a regional basketball league in Latvia.

History
Barsy Atyrau was founded in 2003, with impetus from the Atyrau region Basketball Federation and the Atyrau Board for Tourism and Sports. The Orsk Basketball Federation also provided help, such as sending Leonid Novikov to serve as a coach and adviser.

A women's section was established for the 2007–08 season.

The team won its first trophy in 2009, winning that year's edition of the Kazakhstan Basketball Cup.

In the 2010–11 season, Barsy finished the Kazakhstan Basketball Championship regular season in first place. 
They then swept Caspiy Aktau in three games, to reach the playoff finals for the first time ever. 
Pitted against Tobol Kostanay, the previous year's runners-up, they also won the series 3–0, to win their maiden national championship.

Starting from 2010, Barsy also played in the Baltic Basketball League, a regional league with teams from the Baltic states, and some invited countries.

They played the 2010–11 and 2011–12 seasons in the second division Challenge Cup. From 2012–13), all teams were placed inside four groups in one overall division, the Kazakhstanis advanced to the Last 16.

During the 2013–14 season, they advanced from their group to the playoffs with a 5–7 record, losing in the first round to Šiauliai.

In 2013–14, the club reached the Kazakhstan league finals again, however they were comfortably swept in 3 games by title holders Astana.

Barsy played in the Rietumu līga (Western League), a regional basketball league in Latvia during the 2014–15 season. They finished second in the regular season, with a 15–3 record, before reaching the playoff semifinals.

Whilst playing in foreign leagues, Barsy have played all their games on the road.

Barsy won its second Kazakh Cup in 2022.

Titles
2x Kazakhstan Basketball Championship: champions (2011, 2016)
2x Kazakhstan Basketball Cup: winners (2009, 2022)

Current squad

Notable players
To appear in this section a player must have either:
- Set a club record or won an individual award as a professional player.
- Played at least one official international match for his senior national team or one NBA game at any time.
 Aleksei Backih 
 Leonid Bondarovich

References

External links
FIBA game center profile Retrieved 20 June 2015
AsiaBasket.com profile Retrieved 20 June 2015
Rietumu līga profile Retrieved 20 June 2015 
Baltic Basketball League profile Retrieved 20 June 2015

Basketball teams established in 2003
Basketball teams in Kazakhstan
Atyrau